Johann Arnold may refer to:

 Johann Christoph Arnold (1940–2017), British-American writer
 Johann Gottfried Arnold (1773–1806), German cellist
 Johann Heinrich Arnold (1913–1982), Elder of the Bruderhof Communities